Thumpoly is coastal town in the Alappuzha district and is a famous well-known Christian Marian pilgrimage shrine of Kerala. Thumpoly church    (St.Thomas church,Thumpoly)   
is an ancient church built by the Portuguese and was established in the year 1600s. This church Includes under the Diocese of Alleppey- Roman Catholic Diocese of Alleppey . Thumpoly It is located at a distance of 80 km from Kochi International Airport, 60 Km from Kochi Cochin City , 6 km from Alappuzha city, 20 km from Cherthala, 25  km from kuttanadu, 34 Km from Changanassery  and 52 km from kayamkulam. It is connected to Alappuzha, Arthunkal, Kochi, Ernakulam by road and railway. It is located on the edge of NH 66 (formerly NH 47).The National Highway 66 cuts through the middle of the town. The Arabian Sea is on one side, and a small lake on the other, with the beach of Chakara in Kerala. It is a natural habitat of many rare birds. Thumpoly is known for its canals, which end their course in the Arabian Sea. There are fishing villages on the beaches. The local population are also involved in coir making. Thumpoli is located on the border of Alappuzha Municipality. Thumpoly shares  border with Alappuzha Municipality and Aryad Grama Panchayat. Thumpoly church is the largest landmark of Thumpoli.

Etymology
It is believed that the name 'Thumpoly' came from 'Thoma Pally' which means Church of St. Thomas. During the period of Portuguese, the place was also called 'Thompolis' which means 'The town of St. Thomas'.

Thumpoly Church Feast
The parish of Thumpoly is known for its church, named for St. Thomas and also dedicated to the Blessed Virgin Mary. Darshana Thirunal of Amalolbhava Mata (thumpoly matha) is celebrated every year from  November 27 to December 15 at Thumpoly church. The main feast which lasts for (11) 19 days, is that of the Immaculate Conception, celebrated on 08 December every year ( The main festival day is December 08th.). Ettamidam Thirunal day is December 15th.  Opening of Thiruswaroopa ``Thirunada Thurakkal´´ of Mother of Thumpoly mata on 06th December.  The Thumpoly church festival ends at midnight on December 15th. The statue of 'Our Lady' of Immaculate Conception in the church is called 'Kappalottakaari  Amma' (Sailors Mother )  or 'the mother who came by ship  in the year 1600- 1602s.  Important Vow (Nercha) `` Pattum Kireedavum Ezhunnallippu´´.The main votive offering is the silk and the crown wake up offerings.And also there are many other vows/offerings.(Pattum Kireedavum Ezhunnallipp) . And also on the first Sunday of July, the week of Thomasliha - St.  Thomas's day feast is also celebrated.  The Feast of the Birth(Nativity) of the Blessed Virgin Mary is celebrated from September 1st to September 8th.  Every year from 01st to 31st October the month of Japamala/Rosary is celebrated as a celebration.   These are the one of the most important festivals and pilgrimage shrine in Kerala & Alappuzha district and Diocese of Alleppey.

Sites of interest 
The landmark of the place is a 400 to  500-year-old church called St. Thomas Church, Thumpoly  which was built by Portuguese. The Thumpoly church is 400 to 500 years old and has a long tradition. The Thumpoly church is one of the important pilgrimage centers/shrines of State of Kerala & Alappuzha District and Alleppey Diocese, built in the Portuguese style. During the 1600s and 1602, a ship sailed from Paris (Portugal/Also said to be from Italy) across the Arabian sea, losing control of the ship due to wind, rain and thunder. Thus, the statue of the Immaculate Conception (Virgin Mary) was enshrined in the church (thumpoly ). Thumpoly church was the first church in India at that time to have a statue of the Mother of God religiously and rituals. 

Thirthassery temple is another important monument in Thumpoly. The typical Kerala architectural beauty can be seen this small temple.  There is also a mosque near Thumpoly.

Thumpoly is connected by road and rail -way. The beach at Thumpoly is a major tourist attraction. Thumpoly Beach is located on the west side near thumpoly church. Pilgrim's and tourists also come here. 

Coir handicrafts is a major cottage industry of the area.

The important Near areas of Thumpoly are Poomkavu (Poomkavu - A famous Holy Weekly Pilgrimage Shrine), Chettikadu, Pathirappally, Omanapuzha, Kommadi, Poonthoppu, Mangalam and Malikamukku.

References

External links
 Feast at Thumpoly Church

Cities and towns in Alappuzha district